Khashtarak is a village in the Ijevan Municipality of the Tavush Province of Armenia. Within the village is a recently built church, and close by, to the west and the southeast of the village are some abandoned medieval settlements with khachkars.

Education and health care 
There have been several charitable activities organized by the Armenia Fund in Khashtarak in recent times. The medical center of the village, the kindergarten and the public-education school were all renovated by the efforts of diaspora Armenians.

Gallery

References

External links 

Populated places in Tavush Province